Konstantinos Apostolakis (Greek: Κωνσταντίνος Αποστολάκης; born 28 May 1999) is a Greek professional footballer who plays as a right-back for Super League club Panetolikos.

Career

Panathinaikos
Apostolakis plays mainly as a right-back and joined Panathinaikos from the team's youth ranks.

APOEL
On 7 May 2020, Apostolakis signed a three years' contract with Cypriot giants APOEL for an undisclosed fee. At the end of his first season, he mutually solved his contract with the club.

Panetolikos
On 17 August 2021, Apostolakis signed a two years' contract with Panetolikos F.C. for an undisclosed fee.

Personal life
Apostolakis’ father is the former professional footballer Stratos.

Career statistics

Club

References

External links

1999 births
Living people
Greece under-21 international footballers
Greece youth international footballers
Greek expatriate footballers
Panathinaikos F.C. players
APOEL FC players
Panetolikos F.C. players
Super League Greece players
Cypriot First Division players
Greek expatriate sportspeople in Cyprus
Expatriate footballers in Cyprus
Association football midfielders
Footballers from Athens
Greek footballers